Unified Seevic Palmer's College, trading as USP College (previously known as Seevic and Palmer's Colleges Group), is a large general further education college in Essex, England. It was established in August 2017 from the merger of Palmer's College in Grays, Thurrock, and Seevic College in Thundersley, Benfleet, and traces its history back to the establishment of Palmer's as a charity school in 1706. Seevic College was established as a sixth form college in 1972, with Seevic originally being an acronym for South East Essex Sixth (VI) Form College. Seevic and Palmer's now make up two of the college's three campuses, with the XTEND Digital Campus in Canvey Island forming its third campus. There were 3,588 students enrolled to the college as of November 2021.

The Seevic Campus offers adult education courses for learners of any age. Both campuses offer a special needs department for anyone with a learning disability. The Palmer's campus opened its special needs department in September 2018, following the success of the Seevic Campus one which has been running for several years and has over 94 students in the department.

In 2018 Seevic merged with Palmer's College as part of a government initiative. From September 2018 the colleges were renamed USP College with a new logo.

It was announced in March 2019 that USP had purchased local apprenticeship provider ITEC Learning Technologies which would increase the number of apprenticeship training options USP could offer.

Merging
In 2017 it was announced that Palmer's College and Seevic College would merge to make one college, over the year running up to September 2018, both colleges underwent extensive changes. In June 2018 the college was officially renamed USP College. The new name included a new logo and a new look to both campuses. The new college would continue to offer a mixture of Further Education, Adult Education and Higher Education courses.

Seevic College 

SEEVIC College was a Sixth Form college located in Thundersley, Essex. It offered a variety of GCSEs, A-Levels and Higher Education courses (in association with The University of Hertfordshire, Writtle University College and The Docklands Academy). This is now the SEEVIC campus of USP College.

History

The name was originally an acronym for South East Essex Sixth (VI) Form College. The College in Thundersley opened in September 1972 and was designed to support 12 partner schools across Castle Point and Rochford districts. During the 1990s the college expanded into the former temporary home of Castle Point Borough Council in a building called the White House, the Training for the Millennium Centre on Canvey and a small centre at the former Park School site in Rayleigh. During the noughties they had planned to expand by knocking both the main site and the White House down and rebuilding.

In 2017 OFSTED rated SEEVIC as requires improvement however it came third in the national results for GCSE in Maths.

The college offers courses such as performing arts, science, health and social care. Approximately 2,500 students attend the college.

New Campus Basildon
In 2008 SEEVIC opened a new centre at the Icon in Basildon, named New Campus Basildon in partnership with Prospects College and South East Essex College as part of a government initiative to increase FE provision in the town. In 2011 a second campus was opened at Church Walk, but after the merger of Thurrock and Basildon College with South East Essex College in 2010, the ICON building was closed.  New Campus Basildon as an FE centre was closed and it became a Studio school in 2013, with SEEVIC as its main sponsor. SEEVIC withdrew from sponsoring the studio school in 2016 and it closed in 2017.

Location
The Seevic Campus is located on Kiln Road (A13) Thundersley, Benfleet, Essex, England.

Notable alumni

 Ashley Banjo
 Jordan Banjo
 Emma Blackery
Bobby Lockwood
 Laura J. Spence, Professor of Business Ethics, School of Business and Management, Royal Holloway, University of London, UK.
Andrew Zisserman FRS

Palmer's College

Palmer's College was a sixth form college for 16- to 19-year-olds in Thurrock, Essex, England. It offers a wide range of courses including A-levels, BTECs and Secretarial. It is now one of two campuses of USP College.

History

Palmer's was first opened in 1706 when the merchant William Palmer founded a charity school for "ten poore children" of the parish of Grays Essex, endowing it with valuable property in the town and Lombard Street in the City of London. Initially located in a small building inside the churchyard the school evolved into a boys' school. However, in response to the changing educational landscape initiated by the 1870 Education Act, the trustees of Palmer's charity re-launched the school on a new site on the hill above the town in 1874. To this a girls' school was added in 1876. The schools were grammar schools for both boys and girls, and William Strang, 1st Baron Strang, perhaps Palmer's most distinguished alumnus, recalled it in 1905 as 'a modest establishment, modest that is in size and in material equipment, but not at all modest in the opinion which it held of itself'. The boys' school which admitted both day pupils and boarders until 1970, achieved the status of a public school in 1931–46. In 1972, as part of the reorganisation of education in Essex, the boys' and girls' schools amalgamated, together with Aveley Technical High School, to constitute a sixth form college. During the mid-1970s, the boys' and Aveley schools relocated to the College's present site (until then occupied by the Girls' School alone). The College was supported by the William Palmer College Education Trust, the direct successor of the trustees William Palmer appointed to administer his charity. Artifacts from the schools' past can be seen in the College library.

A 2007 inspection by Ofsted concluded: "Palmer's is an outstanding college." Student achievement and the standard of work were good and success rates overall 'well above national averages for learners from all backgrounds'. The College was also praised for its retention rates and value-added scores.

In 2013 a subsequent report rated the college as "Requires Improvement" because few students studying academic courses were achieving high grades, there were no consistent standards of teaching, learning and assessment, and the college's leadership had failed to maintain the high standards reached in 2007, with many of the implemented measures, particularly regarding the performance management of teachers, being ineffective.

2008 saw a record number of students applying to the College with over 2000 students enrolling. The College was equipped with modern teaching facilities set in landscaped grounds. Both students and the general public had access to a newly refurbished sports and fitness centre (including gym), Palmer's hosts a variety of events for children from local schools on its playing fields.

The Student Executive were the "voice of the students" within the college; they were responsible for organising various college events. The Student Executive of 2007–2008 raised £4,000 for Little Havens Children's Hospice while the Student Executive of 2008/9 raised £3,000 for Cancer Research UK as well as hosting various social events and fundraising days over the course of the year.

The school had a good record of students attaining places on the prestigious Prime Minister's Global Fellowship programme. The school achieved its first two students in the inaugural year of the programme, 2008. In 2009 it had another successful applicant.

In 2006 Palmer's College celebrated its 300th anniversary.

Location
The college is situated on Chadwell Road (B149) next to the A1089 just north of the A126 junction (Marshfoot Interchange). It is close to the boundary between Little Thurrock (to the west) and Chadwell St Mary. It is administratively in Thurrock and although its postal address is Grays, it is located in the religious parish of St Mary the Virgin, Little Thurrock.

Notable alumni

Palmer's Grammar School for Boys
 Sir Roger Bone KCMG, President of Boeing UK since 2005, Ambassador to Brazil from 1999–2004, and to Sweden from 1995–9
Vernon Bell father of British karate
 Maurice Dixson, Executive Chairman of Cranfield Aerospace since 2003 and chief executive from 1987–8 of Royal Ordnance
 Duncan Fallowell, author (briefly)
 Geoff Gillham (1946–2001), playwright, director and co-founder of Live Theatre Company
 Guy Holmes (1905–1967), England footballer
 Henry G. Booker, physicist and electrical engineer
 Mick Jackson (director), TV director, directed the 1984 Threads and the 1987 Life Story
 Prof Geoffrey Thorndike Martin, Edwards Professor of Egyptology from 1988–93 at UCL
 Jeremy Fell Mathews CMG, Attorney General of Hong Kong from 1988–97
 Anthony Moore (Anthony Michaels-Moore)(1957– ), opera singer
 Sir Bryan Nicholson, Chancellor of Sheffield Hallam University from 1992–2001 and Chairman of Bupa from 1992–2001
 Paul Skinner, Chairman from 2003-09 of Rio Tinto Group
 William Strang, first Baron Strang (1893–1978), diplomat
 Richard Tallboys CMG OBE, Ambassador to Vietnam from 1985–7, and chief executive of the World Coal Institute UK from 1988–93
 Prof Peter Wadhams, Professor of Ocean Physics since 2003 at the University of Cambridge, and Director from 1987–92 of the Scott Polar Research Institute
 Roger Wrightson (1939–1986), Essex cricketer

Palmer's Grammar School for Girls
 Jean Lambert (nee Archer),  Green MEP 1999-2019 for London
 Emmy Dinkel-Keet, Dutch artist

Palmer's College
 Daniel Clements, Southend Premier League winning captain of Kingswood FC 2009–10,
 Vivien Ellis, early music and folk singer (Dufay Collective)
 Prof David Nash, Professor of Physical Geography since 2010 at the University of Brighton
 Mark-Anthony Turnage (born 1960), composer
 Anne-Marie (Anne-Marie Rose Nicholson; born 1991), singer-songwriter

External links
 Old Palmerians' Association
 Contact site for pupils who joined Palmer's Boys School in 1965

ITEC Learning Technologies
Basildon ITEC was formed in 1983 by Malcom Bridges, as a provider of IT training when PC's were in their infancy, and had been influenced by the then education minister Ken Baker. They are located at Burnt Mills, in the former Burnt Mills Primary School building and offer a wide range of IT training including foundation degree courses and apprenticeships.

References

Further education colleges in Essex
1706 establishments in England
Education in Thurrock
Educational institutions established in 1706
Grays, Essex
Defunct studio schools
Defunct grammar schools in England